Acrolyta is a genus of wasps belonging to the family Ichneumonidae. The genus was described in 1868 by Arnold Förster and has cosmopolitan distribution. It is a parasitoid of Cotesia wasps.

Species 
 Acrolyta nens (Hartig, 1838)
 Acrolyta rufocincta (Gravenhorst, 1829)

References

Ichneumonidae